The 9th constituency of the Pas-de-Calais is a French legislative constituency in the Pas-de-Calais département.

Description

Pas-de-Calais' 9th constituency is composed of the town of Béthune in the north of the department.

From 1988 the seat has been held by six parties, three from the centre left (the Radical Party of the Left, the Socialist Party and the Citizen and Republican Movement), one from the centre (MoDem), one from the conservative right (the UMP), and one from the far-right (RN). The seat has been won by five different parties in the five elections in the 21st century.

Mayor of Béthune Stéphane Saint-Andre narrowly won the seat at the 2012 elections becoming one of thirteen PRG representatives in the National Assembly.

Historic Representation

Election results

2022

 
 
 
 
 
 
 
 
|-
| colspan="8" bgcolor="#E9E9E9"|
|-

2017

2012

 
 
 
 
 
 
|-
| colspan="8" bgcolor="#E9E9E9"|
|-

2007

 
 
 
 
 
 
 
 
|-
| colspan="8" bgcolor="#E9E9E9"|
|-

2002

 
 
 
 
 
 
 
 
|-
| colspan="8" bgcolor="#E9E9E9"|
|-

1997

Sources
 Official results of French elections from 1998: 

9